Vladimir Kanjuh (Serbian Cyrillic: Владимир Кањух; Ohrid, 4 March 1929), is a professor of pathology and cardiovascular pathology at the University of Belgrade's School of Medicine. He was the editor-in-chief of the journal Medical Investigation for 20 years.

Life 

Kanjuh defended his PhD thesis “Histopathological changes of the pulmonary blood vessels in CHD“ in 1981, in Belgrade.

References

External links 
 Kanjuh's biography at the Serbian Academy of Sciences and Arts

1929 births
Serbian pathologists
Academic staff of the University of Belgrade
Living people